Nankivell and Nancekivell are surnames. Notable people with these surname include:

Nankivell 
Alex Nankivell (born 1996), New Zealand rugby union player
Bill Nankivell (born 1923), Australian politician in South Australia
Edward J. Nankivell (1848–1909), British journalist and stamp collector
Frank A. Nankivell (1869–1959), Australian artist and political cartoonist
Gary Nankivell, master optical craftsman from New Zealand; the Nankivell Observatory was named in his honour
Joice NanKivell Loch (1887–1982), Australian author, journalist and humanitarian worker
Maisie Nankivell (born 1999), Australian netball player and Australian rules footballer
Rex Nan Kivell KCMG (1898–1977), New Zealand-born British art collector

Nancekivell 
Kevin Nancekivell (born 1971), English footballer
Richard Nancekivell, Cornish rugby union player

External links
Nankivell News – personal website, includes history of the name

Cornish-language surnames